Maybee may refer to:

 Maybee, Michigan
 MayBee (born 1979), South Korean singer
 Milton Edgar Maybee (1872–1947)

See also 
 Maybe (disambiguation)
 Mabee, surname